Gurnard is a village and civil parish on the Isle of Wight, two miles to the west of Cowes. Gurnard sits on the edge of Gurnard Bay, enjoyed by the Gurnard Sailing Club.

Gurnard's main street features a pub (Portland Inn), J&K Floral Designs, a few shops and a few houses. The west end of the beach is Gurnard Marsh and a stream called "The Luck" which discharges into the Solent.

A fortification known as Gurnard Fort was built on a headland west of Gurnard Marsh about 1600. The land was eroded, however, and all traces disappeared until an archaeological excavation of a Roman villa in 1864 uncovered traces of Gurnard Fort as well.

Transport is provided by the former Wightbus route 32 to and from Cowes, now run by Southern Vectis. There is no longer a direct service to Newport, Isle of Wight.

See also
All Saints' Church, Gurnard

References

External links
Gurnard Sailing Club website
Isle of Wight Council information
Doughty Newnham Chartered Surveyors website
Photos, accommodation guide, hotels and tourist  information

Villages on the Isle of Wight
Civil parishes in the Isle of Wight
Beaches of the Isle of Wight